The Coahoma County School District (CCSD) is a public school district with its administrative headquarters in Clarksdale, Mississippi (USA).

The district serves the Coahoma County towns of Coahoma, Friars Point, Jonestown, Lula, and Lyon as well as the unincorporated community of Sherard and all other unincorporated areas; it does not serve areas within the City of Clarksdale.

Schools
 Coahoma County Jr./Sr. High School (Clarksdale)
Friars Point Elementary School (Friars Point)
Jonestown Elementary School (Jonestown)
Lyon Elementary School (Lyon)
Sherard Elementary School (Sherard)

High school students also have the option of attending Coahoma Agricultural High School; that school is not a Coahoma County school district school, but instead is operated by Coahoma Community College.

Demographics

2006-07 school year
There were a total of 1,720 students enrolled in the Coahoma County School District during the 2006–2007 school year. The gender makeup of the district was 50% female and 50% male. The racial makeup of the district was 95.70% African American, 2.67% White, and 1.63% Hispanic. 91.1% of the district's students were eligible to receive free lunch.

Previous school years

Accountability statistics

See also
List of school districts in Mississippi

References

External links

Education in Coahoma County, Mississippi
School districts in Mississippi